The Fannie and John Hertz Foundation is an American non-profit organization that awards fellowships to Ph.D. students in the applied physical, biological and engineering sciences. The fellowship provides $250,000 of support over five years. The goal is for Fellows to be financially independent and free from traditional restrictions of their academic departments in order to promote innovation in collaboration with leading professors in the field. Through a rigorous application and interview process, the Hertz Foundation seeks to identify young scientists and engineers with the potential to change the world for the better and supports their research endeavors from an early stage. Fellowship recipients pledge to make their skills available to the United States in times of national emergency.

Hertz Fellowship

History

The Hertz Foundation was established in 1957 with the goal of supporting applied sciences education. The founder, John D. Hertz, was a European emigrant whose family arrived in the United States with few resources, when the Hertz was five years old. Hertz matured into a prominent entrepreneur and business leader (founder of the Yellow Cab Company and owner of the Hertz corporation) as the automotive age burgeoned in Chicago. Initially, the Foundation granted undergraduate scholarships to qualified and financially limited mechanical and electrical engineering students. In 1963, the undergraduate scholarship program was phased out and replaced with postgraduate fellowships leading to the award of the Ph.D. The scope of the studies supported by the fellowships was also enlarged to include applied sciences and other engineering disciplines.

Competitiveness
For the 2017-2018 academic year, nearly 800 applicants applied for 10 spots, giving it an acceptance rate of 1.5%.  Since 1960, the foundation has made awards to 1,271 fellows, with 309 fellows affiliated with the Massachusetts Institute of Technology; 255 with Stanford University; 104 with the University of California, Berkeley; 95 with the California Institute of Technology; and 76 with Harvard University.  These top five universities account for nearly two-thirds of all fellows.

Eligibility and application
To be eligible for a Hertz Fellowships, a student must be citizen or permanent resident of the United States of America. Eligible applicants must be students of the applied sciences, math or engineering, and desire to pursue a Ph.D. degree in the applied sciences, math or engineering. College seniors as well as graduate students already pursuing a Ph.D. may apply.

The application period opens in August, when electronic applications are made available by the Hertz Foundation. All Fellowship applicants are notified by mail of the Foundation's action on their application on or before April 1.

Notable Fellows
 Lars Bildsten, Director, Kavli Institute for Theoretical Physics at University of California, Santa Barbara
 Manjul Bhargava, Fields Medalist 2014
 Eric Boe, NASA Astronaut
 Stephen P. Boyd, Professor of Electrical Engineering at Stanford University
 Ed Boyden, 2016 Breakthrough Prize
 James E. Brau
 Mung Chiang, Arthur LeGrand Doty Professor at Princeton University, 2013 Alan T. Waterman Award recipient
 Isaac Chuang, Quantum computing pioneer
 Kevin M. Esvelt
 Doyne Farmer, an originator of econophysics
 Mike Farmwald, Founder of Rambus
 Alex Filippenko, Richard & Rhoda Goldman Distinguished Professor in the Physical Sciences and Professor of Astronomy at the University of California, Berkeley
 Kathleen Fisher, Deputy Director at DARPA's Information Innovation Office and Adjunct Professor of Computer Science at Tufts University
 Alice P. Gast, President, Imperial College of London
 Kenneth M. Golden, Fellow of Explorers Club
 Leonidas J. Guibas, researcher in computational geometry and Paul Pigott Professor of Computer Science and Electrical Engineering at Stanford University
Nathan Lewis, Professor, California Institute of Technology
Kevin Karplus, Professor, University of California, Santa Cruz
 David Kriegman, researcher in computer vision and Professor of Computer Science at University of California, San Diego
 Peter Hagelstein, Inventor, X-ray laser
 Danny Hillis, Inventor, entrepreneur, and author
 Andrew Houck, Quantum Computist
 Tianhui Michael Li, first Data Scientist in residence at Andreessen Horowitz, founder of The Data Incubator
 Po-Shen Loh, Coach of USA International Mathematical Olympiad Team and Professor of Mathematics at Carnegie Mellon University
 Derek Lidow, Founder of iSuppli Corp.
 Robert Lourie, Head of Futures research at Renaissance Technologies
 John C. Mather, Nobel Laureate 2006
 Mike Montemerlo, Winning Team Leader, DARPA Grand Challenge 2005
 Nathan Myhrvold, Founder, Intellectual Ventures, former CTO, Microsoft
 Dianne P. O'Leary, applied mathematician
 Sabrina Pasterski, Young Physicist
 General Ellen M. Pawlikowski, Commander, Air Force Material Command
Emma Pierson, Assistant Professor of Computer Science at Cornell University
 Joseph Polchinski, Fundamental Physics Prize 2017
 William H. Press, Former Deputy Director for Science and Technology, Los Alamos National Laboratory
 Robert Sedgewick, William O. Baker Professor in Computer Science at Princeton University
 Katelin Schutz
 Kenneth L Shepard
 Ray Sidney, Google entrepreneur
 Alfred Spector, CTO of Two Sigma and former VP of Research at Google
 Rich C. Staats, Commanding General, United States Army Reserve Innovation Command
 Robert Tarjan, Turing Award 1986
 Astro Teller, Director, Google X
 Michael Telson, Former CFO at the Department of Energy
 Lee T. Todd, Jr., Entrepreneur, past president of the University of Kentucky
 Philip Welkhoff, Bill & Melinda Gates Foundation
 Christian Wentz, electrical engineer & entrepreneur
 Carl Wieman, Nobel Laureate 2001
 Ned Wingreen
In 2018, some 30 Hertz Fellows were recognized by MIT Technology Review, Forbes, the Howard Hughes Medical Institute, National Academy of Sciences and many others for outstanding work in their respective fields.

Thesis Prize
The Hertz Foundation requires that each Fellow furnish the Foundation a copy of his or her doctoral dissertation upon receiving the Ph.D. The Foundation's Thesis Prize Committee examines the Ph.D. dissertations for their overall excellence and pertinence to high-impact applications of the physical sciences. Each Thesis Prize winner receives an honorarium of $5,000.

 2017 Kyle Loh, A Developmental Roadmap for the Diversification of Human Tissue fates from Pluripotent Cells
 2016 Paul Tillberg, Expansion Microscopy: Improving Imaging Through Uniform Tissue Expansion
 2015 Jeffrey Weber, Far-From-Equilibrium Phenomena in Protein Dynamics
 2014 Matthew Pelliccione, Local Imaging of High Mobility Two-Dimensional Electron Systems with Virtual Scanning Tunneling Microscopy
 2014 Joseph Rosenthal, Engineered Outer Membrane Vesicles Derived from Probiotic Escherichia Coli Nissle 1917 as Recobinant Subunit Antigen Carriers for the Development of Pathogen-Mimetic Vaccines
 2013 Alex Hegyi, Nanodiamond Imaging: A New Molecular Imaging Approach
 2012 Dario Amodei, Network-Scale Electrophysiology: Measuring and Understanding the Collective Behavior of Neural Circuits
 2012 Vincent Holmberg, Semiconductor Nanowires: From a Nanoscale System to a Macroscopic Material
 2012 Daniel Slichter, Quantum Jumps and Measurement Backaction in a Superconducting Qubit
 2011 Anna Bershteyn, Lipid-coated micro- and nanoparticles as a biomimetic vaccine delivery platform
 2011 Kevin Esvelt, A System for the Continuous Directed Evolution of Biomolecules
 2011 Monika Schleier-Smith, Cavity-Enabled Spin Squeezing for a Quantum-Enhanced Atomic Clock
 2010 Erez Lieberman-Aiden, Evolution and the Emergence of Structure
 2009 Paul Podsiadlo, Layer-by-Layer Assembly of Nanostructures Composites: Mechanics and Applications
 2009 Mikhail Shapiro, Genetically Engineered Sensors for Non-Invasive Molecular Imaging using MRI
 2008 Alexander Wissner-Gross, Physically Programmable Surfaces
 2007 Lilian Childress, Coherent Manipulation of Single Quantum Systems in the Solid State
 2007 Christopher Loose, The Production, Design, and Application of Antimicrobial Peptides
 2007 Cindy Regal, Experimental Realization of BCS-BEC Crossover Physics with a Fermi Gas of Atoms
 2006 Edward Boyden, Task-Selective Neural Mechanisms of Memory Encoding
 2005 Cameron G. R. Geddes, Plasma Channel Guided Laser Wakefield Accelerator
 2004 Youssef Marzouk, Vorticity Structure and Evolution in a Transverse Jet with New Algorithms for Scalable Particle Simulation
 2003 David Kent IV, New Quantum Monte Carlo Algorithms to Efficiently Utilize Massively Parallel Computers
 2002 Daniel Steck, Quantum Chaos, Transport, and Decoherence in Atom Optics
 2001 Krishna S. Nayak, Fast Cardiovascular Magnetic Resonance Imaging
 2000 Joseph H. Thywissen, Internal State Manipulation for Neutral Atom Lithography
 1999 Andrew J. Thiel, Detection of DNA Hybridization to Oligonucleotide Arrays on Gold Surfaces Using In Situ Surface Plasmon Resonance and Fluorescence Imaging Techniques
 1998 Adam T. Woolley, Microfabricated Integrated DNA Analysis Systems
 1997 Deirdre Olynick, In-Situ Studies of Copper Nano-Particles Using a Novel Tandem Ultra-High Vacuum Particle Production Chamber Transmission Electron Microscope
 1997 Eli N. Glezer, Ultrafast Electronic and Structural Dynamics in Solids
 1996 Andrew H. Miklich, Low-Frequency Noise in High-T2 Superconductor Josephson Junctions, SQUIDs, and Magnetometers
 1996 Krishna Shenoy, Monolithic Optoelectronic VLSI Circuit Design and Fabrication for Optical Interconnects
 1995 Eric Altschuler, The Movement Rehearsal Paradigm is a Mental Communication Channel
 1994 Richard D. Braatz, Robust Loopshaping for Process Control
 1992 Kenneth L Shepard, Electron Transport in Mesoscopic Conductors
 1992 Robert C. Barrett, Development and Applications of Atomic Force Spectroscopy
 1990 Scott L. Rakestraw, Monoclonal Antibody-Targeted Laser Photolysis of Tumor Tissue
 1990 H. Paul Shuch, Near Midair Collisions as an Indicator of General Aviation Collision Risk
 1989 W. Neil McCasland, Sensor and Actuator Selection for Fault-Tolerant Control of Flexible Structures
 1988 Michael Reed, Si-SiO2 Interface Trap Anneal Kinetics
 1988 Eric Swartz, Solid-Solid Thermal Boundary Resistance
 1988 K. Peter Beiersdorfer, High Resolution Studies of the X-Ray Transitions in Highly Charged Neonlike Ions of the PLT Tokamak
 1987 Douglas Bowman, High Speed Polycrystalline Silicon Photoconductors for On-Chip Pulsing and Gating
 1987 Brian L. Heffner, Switchable Optical Fiber Taps Using the Acousto-Optic Bragg Interaction
 1987 Dale Stuart, A Guidance Algorithm for Cooperative Tether-Mediated Orbital Rendezvous
 1987 Aryeh M. Weiss, Real Time Control of the Permeability of Crosslinked Polyelectrolyte Membranes to Fluorescent Solutes
 1986 Lawrence C. West, Spectroscopy of GaAs Quantum Wells
 1986 Joel Fajans, Radiation Measurements of an Intermediate Energy Free Electron Laser
 1985 W. Daniel Hillis, The Connection Machine
 1985 Stephen P. Boyd, Volterra Series: Engineering Fundamentals
 1985 Steven R. Hall, A Failure Detection Algorithm for Linear Dynamic Systems
 1984 Andrew M. Weiner, Femtosecond Optical Pulse Generation and Dephasing Measurements in Condensed Matter
 1984 David Tuckerman, Heat-Transfer Microstructures for Integrated Circuits
 1984 Michel A. Floyd, Single-Step Optimal Control of Large Space Structures
 1983 Emanuel M. Sachs, Edge Stabilized Ribbon Growth: A New Method for the Manufacture of Photovoltaic Substrates
 1982 Mike Farmwald, On the Design of High Performance Digital Arithmetic Units
 1982 Lawrence C. Widdoes, Automatic Physical Design of Large Wire-Wrap Digital Systems
 1981 Sherman Chan, Small Signal Control of Multiterminal DC/AC Power Systems
 1981 Peter L. Hagelstein, Physics of Short Wavelength Laser Design
 1981 Charles E. Leiserson, Area-Efficient VLSI Computation
 1981 Thomas McWilliams, Verification of Timing Constraints on Large Digital Systems

See also
 Computational Science Graduate Fellowship
 NDSEG Fellowship
 NSF Graduate Research Fellowship

References

External links
 Hertz Foundation

Educational foundations in the United States
Organizations based in California
Organizations established in 1957
1957 establishments in California